
Year 338 BC was a year of the pre-Julian Roman calendar. At the time it was known as the Year of the Consulship of Camillus and Maenius (or, less frequently, year 416 Ab urbe condita). The denomination 338 BC for this year has been used since the early medieval period, when the Anno Domini calendar era became the prevalent method in Europe for naming years.

Events

By place

Persian Empire 
 The Persian general and vizier, the eunuch Bagoas, falls out of favour with King Artaxerxes III. Bagoas seeks to remain in office by replacing Artaxerxes with his youngest son Arses, whom he thinks will be easier to control. So Bagoas murders Artaxerxes III and all his sons, other than Arses, who is then placed on the throne by Bagoas. Artaxerxes IV Arses is little more than a puppet-king while Bagoas acts as the power behind the throne.

Macedonia 
 After his significant victory over the Locrians, Philip II of Macedon swiftly enters Phocis. He then turns southeast down the Cephissus valley, seizes Elateia and restores the fortifications of the city.
 Athens arranges an alliance with Euboea, Megara, Achaea, Corinth, Acarnania and some other states in the Peloponnesus. However, the most desirable ally for Athens is Thebes. Therefore, the Athenian leader, Demosthenes, goes to the Boeotian city and secures an alliance with Thebes despite the efforts of a Macedonian deputation to persuade Thebes to join with Macedonia. In return, Athens agrees to Thebes controlling Boeotia, Thebes being in command solely on land and jointly at sea, and Athens paying two thirds of the campaign's cost.
 August 2 – Philip II of Macedon defeats the Athenians and Thebans in the Battle of Chaeronea in western Boeotia. His son, Alexander, commands the left wing of the Macedonian army during the battle. In victory, Philip II is harsh on Thebes, but merciful on Athens, thanks to the efforts of the Athenian orator and diplomat, Demades, who helps negotiate a peace agreement between Macedonia and Athens.
 Philip II advances into Peloponnesus. He defeats Thessaly, subdues Sparta and summons a Pan-Hellenic Congress at Corinth. This results in the establishment of Macedonian hegemony over central Greece (including Athens).
 Philip II invaded and devastated much of Laconia, turning the Spartans out, though he did not seize Sparta itself.
 Athenian statesman and orator, Lycurgus, is given control of the state's finances and goes about doubling the annual public revenues.
 King Archidamus III of Sparta, after five years of campaigning in southern Italy, fails to achieve any decisive results and while leading a mercenary army to help Tarentum against the Lucanians, is killed with most of his troops at Manduria in Calabria.
 King Archidamus III is succeeded as the Eurypontid King of Sparta by his son, Agis III.

Sicily 
 Carthage makes another effort to conquer all of Sicily. The Carthaginians dispatch some mercenaries to extend the conflict between Timoleon and the Sicilian tyrants. But this effort ends in the defeat of Hicetas, the tyrant of Leontini, who is taken prisoner and put to death. By a treaty between Syracuse and Carthage, the dominion of Carthage in Sicily is confined to the lands west of the Halycus (Platani) River.
 With peace finally achieved with Carthage, Timoleon of Syracuse is able to depose two more tyrants in Sicily and then retires into private life.

Roman Republic 
 The Latin War ends with the Latin League being dissolved and the individual Latin cities having to accept Rome's terms. Many of the cities are incorporated into the Roman state. In making peace with the cities of the defeated Latin League, Rome offers liberal terms. The men of many of these cities are granted citizenship and, as a result, Rome gains friends rather than enemies.
 With the fall of their chief city, Antium, to the Romans, the Volsci finally abandon their resistance against the Romans and accept an alliance with Rome.

Births 
 Xuan, Chinese queen dowager of Chu (d. 265 BC)

Deaths 
 Artaxerxes III, king of Persia (murdered) (b. c. 425 BC)
 Archidamus III, king of Sparta (killed in battle)
 Isocrates, Athenian orator and rhetorician (b. 436 BC)
 Shang Yang, Chinese statesman of Qin (b. 390 BC)
 Xiao of Qin, Chinese duke of Qin (b. 381 BC)

References